A partial solar eclipse occurred on September 10, 1942. A solar eclipse occurs when the Moon passes between Earth and the Sun, thereby totally or partly obscuring the image of the Sun for a viewer on Earth. A partial solar eclipse occurs in the polar regions of the Earth when the center of the Moon's shadow misses the Earth.

Related eclipses

Solar eclipses 1939–1942

References

External links 

1942 9 10
1942 9 10
1942 in science
September 1942 events